Five ships and three shore establishments of the Royal Navy have borne the name HMS Caledonia after the Latin name for Scotland:

Ships
  was a 3-gun brig launched in 1807.
 was a 120-gun first rate ship of the line launched in 1808. She became a hospital ship and was renamed HMS Dreadnought in 1856 and was broken up in 1875.
 was a  broadside ironclad launched in 1862 and sold in 1886.
HMS Caledonia was a training ship launched in 1810 as the 98-gun second rate . She became a training ship in 1862, was renamed HMS Kent in 1888, HMS Caledonia in 1891, and was sold for breaking up in 1906.
HMS Caledonia was a cadet training ship, formerly the liner . She was transferred to the navy in 1936 and commissioned in 1937. She was burnt by accident in 1939. The wreck was raised and scrapped in 1943.

In 1911, the name HMS Caledonia was proposed for the battleship , which needed to be renamed to free the name New Zealand for use by a new battlecruiser, but the battleship was instead renamed HMS Zealandia.

Shore establishments
 was the navy base at Oban, commissioned in 1943 and paid off in 1945.
 was an artificers' training establishment commissioned in 1946 and paid off in 1985.
 is a support base commissioned in 1996 at Rosyth, Fife, Scotland.

Royal Navy ship names